Hyun-wook, also spelled Hyeon-uk or Hyon-uk, is a Korean masculine given name. Its meaning differs based on the hanja used to write each syllable of the name. There are 35 hanja with the reading "hyun" and 11 hanja with the reading "wook" on the South Korean government's official list of hanja which may be registered for use in given names.

People with this name include:
Park Hyun-wook (born 1967), South Korean writer 
Cho Hyun-wook (born 1970), South Korean high jumper
Jong Hyun-wook (born 1978), South Korean baseball player
Lee Hyun-wook (born 1985), South Korean actor
Kang Hyun-wook (born 1985), South Korean football player 
So Hyon-uk (born 1992), North Korean football player

See also
List of Korean given names

References

Korean masculine given names